Leucophyes is a genus of cylindrical weevils belonging to the family Curculionidae.

Species 
 Leucophyes martorellii (Fairmaire, 1879) 
 Leucophyes occidentalis (Dieckmann, 1982) 
 Leucophyes pedestris (Poda, 1761)

Distribution and habitat 
This species is present in most of  Europe, in the Near East and in North Africa.

References 

 Biolib
 Fauna Europaea

Lixinae